Dennis Boyd may refer to:

Dennis Boyd (American football) (born 1955), NFL player from 1977 to 1982
Dennis Boyd (basketball) (born 1954), American basketball player
Dennis Boyd (rugby league), British rugby league footballer in 1978 Kangaroo tour of Great Britain and France
Oil Can Boyd (Dennis Ray Boyd, born 1959), Major League Baseball pitcher

See also
Denis Boyd (1891–1965), Royal Navy officer